Ranjana Ami Ar Ashbona is a 2011 Bengali language Indian rock musical drama film directed by Anjan Dutt. It won three national film awards in 2011 including best music direction and best feature film in Bengali.

Plot 

Anjan Dutt, Amyt Datta, Lew Hilt, Nondon Bagchi, all in their mid-50s are members of a successful Bangla-band. They go for a show in North Bengal where Ranjana performs a small opening salutation. Anjan Dutt asks Ranjana (Parno Mittra) to come and meet him in Kolkata and promises to help her in recording her solo. Once in Kolkata, Ranjana stays at Anjan's house with him and his housekeeper, Kanchan Mullick. One night Anjan tries to seduce Ranjana but, due to too much drinking, he faints allowing Ranjana to run. But she stays and nurses him. This changes Anjan's attitude towards her and he teaches her music.

After much insisting, an audio company agrees to record Ranjana's song but no one is interested. Anjan seeks the help of his journalist friend and books a prime-time show on a top news channel to promote her.

This results in making her a super-hit rockstar. Anjan is hospitalized and Ranjana comes to meet and tell him about her first rock concert. Ranjana tries to persuaded him to come to the show. He quotes "Ranjana Ami Ar Ashbona." Anjan dies in the hospital while Ranjana performs in the concert.

Critical reception
Ranjana Ami Ar Ashbona was favoured by critics. Anandabazar Patrika gave a score of 8 out of 10. It has three national film awards including Special Jury Award (director: Anjan Dutt), Best Music Direction (Neel Dutt) and Best Feature Film in Bengali. It was one of the movies to receive the highest number of national awards for 2011, declared in 2012.

Cast
 Anjan Dutt
 Parno Mittra as Ranjana
 Ushasie Chakraborty
 Kanchan Mullick
 Amyt Datta
 Kabir Suman
 Abir Chatterjee
 Deborshi Barat
 Lew Hilt
 Nondon Bagchi

Soundtrack

References

Films set in Kolkata
Films directed by Anjan Dutt
Best Bengali Feature Film National Film Award winners
Bengali-language Indian films
2010s Bengali-language films

External links